Dark adaptor goggles, also called red adaptation goggles, are used in the field of meteorology and astronomy for adapting the eyes to the dark prior to an observation at night. They also aid with the identification of clouds during bright sunshine or glare from snow. The goggles are made with red-tinted plastic lenses. Such goggles or glasses are often used by pilots and weather observers to preserve their natural night vision.

To help with the identification of clouds during the day, the goggles should be put on just before the observer goes outside. This will ensure the eyes are not affected by the glare from the sun or snow. For use at night, the observer should put the goggles on about ten minutes prior to going outside. Once the observer is outside and away from major sources of light, the goggles may be removed and the observer's vision should be adapted to the dark. Although the goggles are designed to be worn indoors, some people find walking around inside, especially up and down stairs, to be difficult.

At no time should the goggles be used to help assess the visibility.

Concept
Dark adaptor goggles were invented by Wilhelm Trendelenburg in 1916.
The concept is based on the work by Antoine Béclère on dark adaptation of the eye, where it is noted that fluoroscopy relies on the use of the retinal rods of the eye. 
Since retinal rods are insensitive to long wavelengths of light, such as red light, while retinal cones are not, the goggles enabled the physicians to adapt their eyes in preparation for the fluoroscopic procedure while still being able to perform other work. Prior to the invention of these goggles, physicians were required to sit in the darkened room where the procedure would be performed for extended periods to adapt their eyes to the low lighting conditions.

See also
 Purkinje effect

References

 Environment CanadaAtmospheric Environment Services, Manual of Surface Weather Observations (MANOBS), 7th Edition, January 1977.

Meteorological instrumentation and equipment
Goggles